The Supertaça de Portugal de Rugby is a Portuguese national rugby union organized by the Portuguese Rugby Federation, and disputed by the winners of national championship and Portuguese cup.
 
Agronomia are the current holders.

Supertaça de Portugal finals

Performance by club

See also
 Rugby union in Portugal

References

External links
 Federação Portuguesa Rugby site

Rugby union competitions in Portugal
1988 establishments in Portugal